Kotovka is a rural locality (a khutor) in Novolimanskoye Rural Settlement, Petropavlovsky District, Voronezh Oblast, Russia. The population was 228 as of 2010.

Geography 
Kotovka is located 19 km east of Petropavlovka (the district's administrative centre) by road. Progoreloye is the nearest rural locality.

References 

Rural localities in Petropavlovsky District, Voronezh Oblast